David W. Heckler (born March 7, 1947) is an American politician and judge from Pennsylvania who served as a Republican member of the Pennsylvania State Senate for the 10th district from 1993 to 1997.

Early life and education
Heckler was born in Abington, Pennsylvania and graduated from Yale University and the University of Virginia Law School.

Career
Heckler served as a member of the Pennsylvania House of Representatives for the 143rd district from 1987 to 1993. He served as a member of the Pennsylvania Senate for the 10th district from 1993 to 1997.

After leaving the state senate, he was elected Judge of the Pennsylvania Court of Common Pleas for Bucks County including as President Judge from 2004 to 2008.

In 2009, Heckler left the court and was elected District Attorney of Bucks County, and re-elected in 2013. Heckler resigned in 2016, and was succeeded by then Chief of Prosecution Matt Weintraub.

References

External links
Office of the Bucks County District Attorney official government website
Dave Heckler for District Attorney official campaign website
Pennsylvania Senate - David W. Heckler official PA Senate website (archived)

|-

|-

1947 births
20th-century American politicians
County district attorneys in Pennsylvania
Judges of the Pennsylvania Courts of Common Pleas
Living people
Republican Party members of the Pennsylvania House of Representatives
Pennsylvania lawyers
Republican Party Pennsylvania state senators
People from Abington Township, Montgomery County, Pennsylvania
University of Virginia School of Law alumni
Yale University alumni